Stained Class is the fourth studio album by English heavy metal band Judas Priest, released on 10 February 1978 by Columbia Records. It is the first of three Judas Priest albums to feature drummer Les Binks, as well as the first to feature the band's now well-known logo. The album features "Exciter", considered an early precursor to speed metal and thrash metal, as well as a cover version of "Better by You, Better than Me" by Spooky Tooth, which garnered the band a great deal of negative attention several years after its release when a pair of fans were allegedly influenced by the song to make a suicide pact. Nonetheless, Stained Class is regarded by some as one of Judas Priest's best albums.

Overview
Stained Class is the only Judas Priest album to feature songwriting by all five members of the band. Newly added drummer Les Binks earned a songwriting credit for "Beyond the Realms of Death", and bassist Ian Hill received his first songwriting credit for co-writing "Invader" with vocalist Rob Halford and lead guitarist Glenn Tipton.

Artist Rosław Szaybo's cover artwork introduced the now-classic Judas Priest logo, replacing the Gothic Script logo which appeared on all of the band's previous albums. Stained Class was the first Judas Priest album to crack the Billboard 200 chart and was eventually certified gold in the US.

Dennis MacKay was brought in by CBS Records to produce the album. His resume at the time consisted mainly of jazz fusion artists and more progressive rock artists such as David Bowie and Supertramp. The recording sessions for Stained Class took place in October and November 1977 at Chipping Norton Recording Studios in Oxfordshire.

"Better by You, Better than Me" was a last-minute addition to the album when CBS Records insisted on including something with commercial potential to liven up an album they felt had a very dark and sinister tone. The song was recorded with producer James Guthrie separately from the rest of the album, as MacKay had moved on to other projects and was no longer available. The band was reportedly so impressed with Guthrie's production on "Better by You, Better than Me" that they asked him to produce their next album, Killing Machine.

Critical reception

In 2005, Stained Class was ranked number 307 in Rock Hard magazine's book of The 500 Greatest Rock & Metal Albums of All Time. In 2017, it was ranked 43rd in Rolling Stone's "100 Greatest Metal Albums of All Time".

After the success of subsequent Judas Priest albums in the US, Stained Class would eventually be certified Gold.

The song "Invader" was finally added to the band's setlists in 2021, making "Heroes End" the only song off the album that has never been performed live.

Lawsuit

Twelve years after its release, Stained Class was the subject of a 1990 civil action brought against the band by the family of a teenager, James Vance, who entered into a suicide pact with his friend Ray Belknap after allegedly listening to "Better by You, Better than Me" on 23 December 1985. Belknap succeeded in killing himself, and Vance was left critically injured after surviving a self-inflicted gunshot to the face, eventually dying of a methadone overdose three years later. The suit alleged that Judas Priest recorded subliminal messages on the song that said "do it". The suit was eventually dismissed. The song was originally written and performed by the band Spooky Tooth.

Three weeks after the lawsuit wrapped up, the band kicked off their Painkiller Tour by playing "Better by You, Better than Me" on the first concert in Burbank, California on 13 September. It constitutes Judas Priest's only live performance of the song since 1979.

Comedian Bill Hicks ridiculed the lawsuit as part of his act, pointing out (as many others have also done) the absurdity of the notion that a successful band would wish to kill off their purchasing fanbase.

Track listing

Personnel
Judas Priest
Rob Halford – vocals
K. K. Downing – guitars
Glenn Tipton – guitars
Ian Hill – bass
Les Binks – drums

Additional personnel
 Dave Holland – drums (Track 10, 1988)
 Scott Travis – drums (Track 11, 1990)

Production
Produced by Dennis MacKay and Judas Priest, and engineered by Neil Ross, except "Better By You, Better Than Me", produced by James Guthrie and Judas Priest, and engineered by Ken Thomas and Paul Northfield
Coordinated by John Blackburn 
Mixed by Neil Ross, Ken Thomas and Paul Northfield
Art design by Rosław Szaybo
Photography by Ronald Kass
David Hemmings – management
Arnakata Limited – management

Charts

Certifications

|-

References

External links
 Stained Class at the Judas Priest Info Pages site. Accessed 10 July 2005.

1978 albums
Columbia Records albums
Judas Priest albums